Cristián Rodríguez Martin (born 3 March 1995 in El Ejido) is a Spanish racing cyclist, who currently rides for UCI WorldTeam . He was named in the start list for the 2016 Giro d'Italia, and the 2017 Giro d'Italia.

Major results

2015
 1st  Overall Vuelta Ciclista a León
1st Stage 1
 2nd Time trial, National Under-23 Road Championships
2016
 10th Overall Tour de l'Avenir
2017
 4th Giro dell'Appennino
2020
 9th Overall Tour de Hongrie
 9th Overall Volta a Portugal em Bicicleta 
2021
 1st  Overall Tour du Rwanda
1st Stage 8
 4th Overall Route d'Occitanie
 5th Mont Ventoux Dénivelé Challenge
2022
 1st  Mountains classification, Tour of the Basque Country
 2nd Overall Vuelta a Andalucía
 6th Mont Ventoux Dénivelé Challenge
 8th Overall Route d'Occitanie
2023
 8th Overall Tour of Oman

Grand Tour general classification results timeline

References

External links

1995 births
Living people
Spanish male cyclists
Sportspeople from the Province of Almería
Cyclists from Andalusia